Clare Alice Wright,  (born 14 May 1969) is an American Australian historian, author and broadcaster. She is a professor of history at La Trobe University, and was the winner of the 2014 Stella Prize. Wright has worked as a political speechwriter, university lecturer, historical consultant, and radio and television broadcaster and podcaster.

Early life and education
Wright was born in Ann Arbor, Michigan, in 1969. She migrated to Australia in 1974 with her mother.

Wright holds a Bachelor of Arts degree (with Honours) in history from the University of Melbourne (1991), a Master of Arts in public history from Monash University (1993) and a Doctor of Philosophy in Australian studies from the University of Melbourne (2002).

Career
From 2004 to 2009, she was an Australian Research Council postdoctoral research fellow at La Trobe University. She was the executive officer of the History Council of Victoria from 2003 to 2004.

Wright is the author of a number of books which garnered both critical and popular acclaim. Her second book, The Forgotten Rebels of Eureka, took her ten years to research and write.  It won the 2014 Stella Prize.

In 2016, Wright won the Alice Literary Award, presented by the Society for Women Writers, for "distinguished and long-term contribution to literature by an Australian woman".

In 2019, her book, You Daughters of Freedom: The Australians Who Won the Vote and Inspired the World, was shortlisted for the Prime Minister's Literary Awards, shortlisted for the Queensland Literary Awards University of Southern Queensland History Book Award, and longlisted for the CHASS Australia Book Prize (an annual prize awarded by the Council for the Humanities, Arts and Social Sciences)

Wright was awarded the Medal of the Order of Australia in the 2020 Australia Day Honours in recognition of her "service to literature, and to historical research."

, Wright writes and presents Shooting the Past, a history radio series and podcast for ABC Radio National. Wright is the co-host of the La Trobe University podcast Archive Fever.

She is a former board director at the Wheeler Centre and a member of the expert advisory panel for the Australian Republic Movement. Since 2014, Wright has been a principal research fellow at La Trobe University in Melbourne. In 2019, she was promoted to full professor. , Wright is ARC (Australian Research Council) Future Fellow, History.

Works

Personal life
She lives in Melbourne with her husband, furniture designer and craftsman Damien Wright, and their three children.

References

External links

Official website

1969 births
American emigrants to Australia
Australian historians
Australian women historians
Academic staff of La Trobe University
Living people
Monash University alumni
Recipients of the Medal of the Order of Australia
University of Melbourne alumni
Writers from Ann Arbor, Michigan
Writers from Melbourne
People educated at Mac.Robertson Girls' High School